James Walter Hunt (born December 4, 1939) is an American actor. He is perhaps best known for his role as David in Invaders from Mars (1953).  In the 1986 remake of the same film he plays the police chief.

Hunt has also appeared in films like Song of Love; Sorry, Wrong Number; Week-End with Father and many more. He often appeared opposite Gigi Perreau.

Filmography
Song of Love (1947)
The Mating of Millie (1948)
Pitfall (1948)
Sorry, Wrong Number (1948)
Family Honeymoon (1948)
Holiday Affair (1949)
Rusty's Birthday (1949)
Top o' the Morning (1949)
Special Agent (1949)
Louisa (1950)
Cheaper by the Dozen (1950)
Saddle Tramp (1950)
Shadow on the Wall (1950)
The Capture (1950)
 Again Pioneers (1950)
 Her First Romance (1951)
Katie Did It (1951)
Belles on Their Toes (1952)
All American (1953)
Invaders from Mars (1953)
The Lone Hand (1953)
She Couldn't Say No (1954)
Invaders from Mars (1986)

References

Bibliography

 Holmstrom, John (1996). The Moving Picture Boy: An International Encyclopaedia from 1895 to 1995. Norwich: Michael Russell, p. 216–217.

External links

1939 births
American male child actors
American male film actors
Male actors from California
20th-century American male actors
Living people